Treviño is a municipality in Spain.

Treviño or Trevino may also refer to:

People
Last name
Treviño (surname), people with this surname
Nicolas Treviño, fictional character on the soap opera Dallas

First name
Trevino Betty (born 1971), Canadian sprinter
Trevino Brings Plenty, Lakota Sioux poet and musician
Trevino Forbes, Namibian politician

Places
Spain
Busto de Treviño, a hamlet in the municipality of Condado de Treviño, in Burgos province, Castile and León
Condado de Treviño, a municipality in Burgos province, Castile and León
Treviño enclave, an enclave of the Basque Country in northern Spain
Villamayor de Treviño, a municipality in Burgos province, Castile and León
Elsewhere
General Treviño, a municipality in northern Mexico
Trevino, Wisconsin, an unincorporated community in the United States

Other
Jacinto Treviño College, a defunct college in Mercedes, Texas
Rick Trevino (album), a 1994 album by the singer of the same name
Trevino–Uribe Rancho, a historic fortified home in San Ygnacio, Texas
Vidal M. Trevino School of Communications and Fine Arts, a high school in Laredo, Texas

See also

Travino, a village in Russia
Trebino, a village in North Macedonia